Sam Williams (born  – death unknown) was a rugby union footballer who played in the 1880s and 1890s. He played at representative level for British Isles, and at club level for Salford (captain), as a forward. Prior to Tuesday 2 June 1896, Salford were a rugby union club.

Playing career

International honours
Sam Williams won cap(s) for British Isles while at Salford on the 1888 British Lions tour to New Zealand and Australia.

Regional honours
Sam Williams was selected for the North versus the South, the first Salford player to achieve this.

County honours
Sam Williams won cap(s) for Lancashire while at Salford.

References

External links
Search for "Williams" at espn.co.uk (1888 British Isles tourists statistics missing (31 December 2017))
Statistics at lionsrugby.com
Football – British Football Team’s Visit To New Zealand.
The Return Of The English Team To Their Native Land
Football. A team of British Rugby footballers visited the colonies in April
Lions tour to Australia, 1888... and 2013

1862 births
British & Irish Lions rugby union players from England
English rugby union players
Lancashire County RFU players
Place of birth missing
Place of death missing
Rugby union forwards
Salford Red Devils captains
Salford Red Devils players
Year of birth uncertain
Year of death unknown